Zanzibar Premier League is the top division of the Zanzibar Football Association. It was created in 1926.

Previous winners

1926 : Mnazi Mmoja
1927-58 : Unknown champions (**)
1959 : Malindi
1960-63 : Unknown champions (**)
1964 : Malindi
1965-80 : Unknown champions (**)
1981 : Ujamaa
1982 : Ujamaa
1983 : Small Simba
1984 : KMKM (*)
1985 : Small Simba
1986 : KMKM
1987 : Miembeni
1988 : Small Simba
1989 : Malindi (*)
1990 : Malindi
1991 : Small Simba
1992 : Malindi (*)
1993 : Shengeni
1994 : Shengeni
1995 : Small Simba
1996 : Mlandege
1997 : Mlandege
1998 : Mlandege
1999 : Mlandege
2000 : Kipanga
2001 : Mlandege
2002 : Mlandege
2003 : Jamhuri
2004 : KMKM
2005 : Polisi
2006 : Polisi
2007 : Miembeni
2008 : Miembeni
2009 : Mafunzo
2010 : Zanzibar Ocean View
2011 : Mafunzo (mini-league)
2012 : Super Falcon (mini-league)
2013 : KMKM
2014 : KMKM
2015 : Mafunzo
2016 : Zimamoto
2017 : JKU
2018 : JKU
2019 : KMKM
2020 : Mlandege
2021 : KMKM
2022 : KMKM

(*) in these years, the champions of Zanzibar (Island league) won the Union League against the winners of the Mainland (Tanganyika) League and thereby the Tanzanian Premier League.

(**) between 1926 and 1980 the competition was not permanent, so most of the data about the champions winning the title were unknown.

Performance by club

Topscorers

External links
RSSSF competition history

Football competitions in Zanzibar
Zanzibar
Sports leagues established in 1981
Football leagues in Tanzania